Delhi Pradesh Congress Committee (DPCC) is the Pradesh Congress Committee (state wing) of the Indian National Congress (INC) serving in the union territory of Delhi. Anil Chaudhary is the president of Delhi Pradesh Congress Committee. Abhishek Dutt, Mudit Agarwal, Shivani Chopra, Ali Mehdi and Jaikishan are the Vice Presidents of Delhi Pradesh Congress Committee.

Mohd Hedayatullah (Gentle) is the Chairman of Social Media Department, Delhi Pradesh Congress Committee. Sandeep Goswami is the Treasurer. Media Department is headed by Parvez Alam.

Amit Malik is Former General Secretary of Delhi Pradesh Congress Committee and Former President of Delhi Pradesh Youth Congress.

Structure and composition

List of presidents

List of the chief ministers of Delhi from the Indian National Congress

Following is the list of the chief ministers of Delhi from Indian National Congress:

See also
 Indian National Congress
 Congress Working Committee
 All India Congress Committee
 Pradesh Congress Committee

References

External links
 

Indian National Congress by state or union territory
Politics of Delhi